The first season of the anthology black comedy–crime drama television series Fargo, premiered on April 15, 2014, on FX. Starring Billy Bob Thornton, Allison Tolman, Colin Hanks and Martin Freeman, the season consisted of ten episodes and concluded its initial airing on June 17, 2014.

Set from January 2006 to February 2007, the season follows hitman Lorne Malvo (Thornton) who stops at a hospital in Bemidji, Minnesota following a car accident and influences local mild-mannered insurance salesman Lester Nygaard (Freeman) with his violent and deceptive ways. Their meeting sets forth a series of murders throughout the city. Meanwhile, Deputy Molly Solverson (Tolman) of Bemidji and Officer Gus Grimly (Hanks) of Duluth attempt to solve several crimes across the state that they believe may be linked to Malvo and Nygaard. 

Bob Odenkirk, Keith Carradine, Joey King, Glenn Howerton, Kate Walsh, Russell Harvard, Adam Goldberg, Oliver Platt, Keegan-Michael Key, and Jordan Peele all make recurring appearances.

Filming of the first season began in Calgary, Alberta, in late 2013 and concluded in 2014. The first season received acclaim from critics, praising its writing, directing and the performances of Thornton, Tolman, Hanks and Freeman. The season won the Primetime Emmy Award for Outstanding Miniseries, along with Outstanding Directing and Outstanding Casting, as well as fifteen other nominations. It was nominated for five Golden Globe Awards, winning Best Miniseries or Television Film and Best Actor – Miniseries or Television Film for Thornton's performance as Malvo.

Cast

Main
 Billy Bob Thornton as Lorne Malvo, a hitman with a violent and deceptive nature, who crashes his car in Bemidji, Minnesota, while passing through.
 Allison Tolman as Deputy Molly Solverson, a police deputy from Bemidji who is hot on the case of Malvo and Nygaard.
 Colin Hanks as Officer Gus Grimly, a kindly officer from Duluth, Minnesota, who meets Malvo after stopping him for speeding.
 Martin Freeman as Lester Nygaard, a hapless life insurance salesman from Bemidji who meets Malvo in the hospital after an encounter with a childhood bully.

Recurring

Guest stars
 Kevin O'Grady as Sam Hess, Lester's childhood bully and a truck salesman with affiliations to the Fargo mob.
 Shawn Doyle as Chief Vern Thurman, the trusted leader of the Bemidji police force.
 Carlos Diaz as young Stavros Milos
 Allegra Fulton as Helena Milos, Stavros' ex-wife.
 Eve Harlow as young Helena Milos

Episodes

Production
In 2012, it was announced that FX, with the Coen brothers as executive producers, was developing a new television series based on the 1996 Academy Award-winning film Fargo. It was later announced that adaptation would be a 10-episode limited series.

Series creator Noah Hawley served as the sole writer for all ten episodes of the season, while the task of directing was given to Adam Bernstein, Randall Einhorn, Colin Bucksey, Scott Winant and Matt Shakman. On August 2, 2013, it was announced that Billy Bob Thornton had signed on to star in the series. On September 27, 2013, Martin Freeman also signed on to star. On October 3, 2013, it was announced that Colin Hanks was cast in the role of Duluth police officer Gus Grimly. Production began in fall 2013 with filming taking place in and around Calgary, Alberta.

The season featured many guest appearances, such as Bob Odenkirk, Adam Goldberg, Russell Harvard, Oliver Platt, Glenn Howerton, Keegan-Michael Key, Jordan Peele, Keith Carradine, Kate Walsh, Julie Ann Emery, Rachel Blanchard, Joshua Close, Susan Park, Gary Valentine, Stephen Root and Shawn Doyle.

Reception

Critical response
The first season of Fargo received critical acclaim. It holds a Metacritic score of 85 out of 100 based on 40 reviews, indicating "universal acclaim". On Rotten Tomatoes, it has a 97% rating based on 140 reviews, with an average rating of 8.45/10. The site's summary says that "Fargo presents more quirky characters and a new storyline that is expertly executed with dark humor and odd twists."

Robert Bianco of USA Today gave it a highly positive review, praising the performances of the cast and "the depth of its characterizations and the individuality of its approach." Brian Tallerico of RogerEbert.com acclaimed the series and wrote, "With an amazing ensemble driven by great performances from top to bottom, an incredibly smart writers' room, brilliant callbacks to the original that feel more inspired than forced, and a filmmaking style that feels as cinematic as this grand Minnesotan tragedy deserves, Fargo is one of the most addictive new shows of the year." However, Emily Nussbaum of The New Yorker criticized the series for its sexualized violence and its lack of ambiguity and pathos.

Awards and nominations

Home media release
On October 14, 2014, 20th Century Fox Home Entertainment released the first season of Fargo on DVD and Blu-ray. In addition to all ten episodes, both DVD and Blu-ray disc formats include audio commentaries on three episodes by Billy Bob Thornton, Allison Tolman and Noah Hawley, deleted scenes, three behind-the-scenes featurettes, and in select sets, an exclusive, collectible beanie.

References

External links
 
 

Television series set in 2006
2014 American television seasons